Sir Thomas Taylor, 1st Baronet (25 July 1662 – 8 August 1736) was an Anglo-Irish politician.

Taylor was the son of Thomas Taylor, who had settled in Ireland from Sussex following the Cromwellian conquest of Ireland in 1652, and Anne Axtell. He sat in the Irish House of Commons as the Member of Parliament for Kells between 1692 and 1699. He then represented Belturbet from 1703 to 1713, before returning to sit for Kells from 1713 to 1736. In 1704 Taylor was created a baronet, of Kells in the Baronetage of Ireland.

He married Anne Cotton, daughter of Sir Robert Cotton, 1st Baronet, of Combermere and Hester Salusbury, on 20 June 1682. He was succeeded in his title by his eldest son, also called Thomas.

References

1662 births
1736 deaths
17th-century Anglo-Irish people
18th-century Anglo-Irish people
Irish MPs 1692–1693
Irish MPs 1695–1699
Irish MPs 1703–1713
Irish MPs 1713–1714
Irish MPs 1715–1727
Irish MPs 1727–1760
Baronets in the Baronetage of Ireland
Members of the Parliament of Ireland (pre-1801) for County Cavan constituencies
Members of the Parliament of Ireland (pre-1801) for County Meath constituencies
Taylour family